The Três Irmãos Dam is an embankment dam with gravity sections on the Tietê River in Pereira Barreto of São Paulo state in Brazil. The dam was completed in 1991 and the five  Francis turbine-generators were commissioned between November 1993 and January 1999. It is owned and operated by Companhia Energética de São Paulo (CESP). The dam also provides for navigation with two ship locks.

References

External links

Dams completed in 1991
Dams in São Paulo (state)
Embankment dams
Hydroelectric power stations in Brazil
Locks of Brazil
1991 establishments in Brazil